The 2018 Scottish Challenge Cup final, also known as the IRN-BRU Cup final for sponsorship reasons, was a football match that took place on 24 March 2018 at McDiarmid Park, between Dumbarton and Inverness Caledonian Thistle. It was the 27th final of the Scottish Challenge Cup since it was first organised in 1990 to celebrate the centenary of the now defunct Scottish Football League, and the fifth since the SPFL was formed. The match was won by Inverness CT 1–0 with a stoppage time winner, marking their second win in the tournament since its inception and their first silverware since the 2014–15 Scottish Cup.

Route to the final

The competition is a knock-out tournament and was contested by 56 teams from Scotland, Wales, Northern Ireland and the Republic of Ireland in 2017–18. Two teams from the Republic of Ireland were added to the competition in 2017–18, following the addition of teams from Wales and Northern Ireland in 2016–17. 

Those participating were the 30 clubs that played in the 2017–18 Championship, League One and League Two of the Scottish Professional Football League along with the top four teams from the 2016–17 Highland and Lowland Leagues. The top two teams from the 2016–17 Welsh Premier League and 2016–17 NIFL Premiership and the U20s squads of the teams competing in the 2016–17 Premiership were also invited to compete. Bray Wanderers and Sligo Rovers, as the League of Ireland's highest-ranked non-European participants in 2016, were also invited.

Dumbarton

Inverness Caledonian Thistle
Inverness received a bye to the second round, as the team that had finished 12th in the 2016–17 Scottish Premiership.

Match details

References

Scottish Challenge Cup Finals
Scottish Challenge Cup Final 2018
Scottish Challenge Cup Final 2018
Challenge Cup Final
3